Antequera is a district of the San Pedro Department, Paraguay with Puerto Antequera the main location at the Paraguay River. It is an agricultural region. Puerto Antequera has 1,632 inhabitants.

It can be reached by Route 11.